Timleon Ambelas (Greek: Τιμολέων Αμπελάς, 1850–1929) was a Greek poet.

Biography

Ampelas was born in the city of Patras in Greece and he lived much of his time in the capital city of Athens and in the island of Syros.  He studied law in 1874 and became justice and withdrew totally from the judicial branch as judge of the court of appeal.  From those members of the Philological Council of Athens Parnassos.  He began to write theatrical works.

Bibliography

Here are several works created by Ampelas:

Τιμολέων Αμπελάς

References
The first version of the article is translated and is based from the article at the Greek Wikipedia (el:Main Page)

External links

1850 births
1929 deaths
Writers from Patras
Poets from Achaea